Ljubiša Stefanović (born 1963), commonly known as Lou Stefanovic, is a Serbian-American former professional basketball player. He played college basketball for the Illinois State.

College career 
In 1981, Stefanovic went on to play for Illinois State University in Normal, Illinois. As a senior with the Redbirds in the 1984–85 season, Stefanovic averaged team-high 17.5 points and seven rebounds per game and was named to the Missouri Valley All-Second Team.

Professional career 
Stefanovic was selected with the 97th overall pick by the Seattle SuperSonics in the 1985 NBA draft. Following the draft, Stefanovic officially signed for a club in the Spanish ACB League. Few days before the start of the 1985–86 season, he signed a deal with Crvena zvezda of the Yugoslav Basketball League. Afterwards, he had stints in France, Switzerland, and Italy.

National team career 
In summer 1983, Stefanovic was an initial roster member for the Yugoslavia University team, but failed to make the final 12-man roster led by Dražen Petrović for the 1983 Summer Universiade in Edmonton, Alberta, Canada.

Personal life 
Stefanovic's grandfather Branko was a native of Serbia who fought in World War II before emigrating to Gary, Indiana to find work in the steel mills. His father Zoran received a visa to the United States in February 1970 and brought him as a young child.

Stefanovic married Helen, with whom he has two sons, Dejan (b. 1994) and Sasha (b. 1998). Sasha played college basketball for the Purdue Boilermakers.

See also 
 List of Serbian Americans
 Oklahoma City Thunder draft history
 Saint Sava Church, Merrillville, Indiana

References

External links
Illinois State Athletics Percy Family Hall of Fame

1963 births
Living people
American expatriate basketball people in France
American expatriate basketball people in Italy
American expatriate basketball people in Serbia 
American expatriate basketball people in Switzerland
American men's basketball players
American people of Serbian descent
Basketball players from Indiana
Illinois State Redbirds men's basketball players
KK Crvena zvezda players
Naturalized citizens of the United States
People from Aleksinac
Seattle SuperSonics draft picks
Serbian emigrants to the United States
Serbian expatriate basketball people in France
Serbian expatriate basketball people in Italy
Serbian expatriate basketball people in Switzerland
Serbian expatriate basketball people in the United States
Serbian men's basketball players
Small forwards
Yugoslav men's basketball players
Yugoslav emigrants to the United States
Date of birth missing (living people)